Bonita is a former unincorporated community in Washington County, Oregon, United States, now located within the boundaries of the city of Tigard.

History
The name "Bonita" derives from the Spanish word meaning "beautiful"; and it was named by local resident George W. Cassaday. Bonita was a former station of the Oregon Electric Railway.

References

Unincorporated communities in Washington County, Oregon
Unincorporated communities in Oregon
Tigard, Oregon